John Addey is the name of:
John Addey (astrologer) (1920–1982), English astrologer
John Addey (shipbuilder) (1550–1606), master shipwright

See also
Addey (surname)